Liang Shiyi (May 5, 1869 – April 9, 1933) was a Chinese minister who served as premier of China during the Beiyang government from 1921 to 1922.

Biography
Liang Shiyi was born in Sanshui, Guangdong in 1869. In the Qing dynasty, he was put in charge of railways, the most profitable ministry of the government. This allowed him to create the influential Communications Clique.  He was a close supporter of Yuan Shikai, served as his finance minister, and supported Yuan during the National Protection War.

After Yuan's death, President Li Yuanhong ordered the arrest of the eight top monarchists of Yuan's regime, this caused Liang to flee to Hong Kong. He returned in 1918 to run for the National Assembly of the Republic of China.

His Communications Clique was a distant second compared to Duan Qirui's Anfu Club but nevertheless he became speaker of the Senate. He then became premier when Jin Yunpeng was forced to resign in December 1921.

His month-long premiership was the subject of dispute between his supporter, Marshal Zhang Zuolin, and his detractor, General Wu Peifu. When Wu forced his resignation on January 25, 1922, it caused the First Zhili-Fengtian War. Liang was fortunate to avoid the war himself: he left Beijing under the excuse of illness as soon as he resigned. The Northern Expedition forced him to flee once again to Hong Kong in 1928, then he shuttled between Shanghai and Hong Kong until the Japanese invaded Manchuria in 1931. He died at Shanghai in 1933.

References 
 

 

1869 births
1933 deaths
Premiers of the Republic of China
Republic of China politicians from Guangdong
People from Sanshui District
Politicians from Foshan